Jallow is an English transcription of a surname of Fula origin and may refer to:

 Antouman Jallow (born 1981), Gambian/Swedish professional footballer
 Chernow Jallow QC, former Attorney General of the British Virgin Islands
 Haddy Jallow (born 1985), Gambian-Swedish non-professional actress
 Hassan Bubacar Jallow (born 1950), Gambian lawyer, politician, and jurist
 Lamin Jallow, Gambian footballer
 Momodou Malcolm Jallow (born 1975), Gambian-born Swedish politician
 Ousman Jallow (born 1988), Gambian football striker
 Pierre Jallow (born 1979), Gambian basketball player

See also
 Jalloh, another English transcription of the surname
 Diallo, a French transcription
 Djaló, a Portuguese and Creole transcription

Gambian surnames
Fula surnames